The monster cereals are a line of breakfast cereals produced by General Mills Corporation in North America. The line was introduced in 1971 and, at various times, has included five brands, each featuring a cartoon version of a classic movie monster: Count Chocula, Franken Berry, and Boo Berry (all produced seasonally from September 1 to October 31), as well as Frute Brute and Fruity Yummy Mummy (both discontinued, except for limited productions).

History

In March 1971, the first two cereals in the line were introduced, the chocolate-flavored Count Chocula and the strawberry-flavored Franken Berry. In the commercials, the two monsters, Count Alfred Chocula and Franken Berry, would engage in comic bickering over which cereal was better, when something or someone else (usually Boo Berry) interfered in their verbal sparring and scared them out of their wits.

In February 1972, Franken Berry cereal included an indigestible pigment that turned some children's feces pink, a symptom sometimes referred to as "Franken Berry Stool". The Count Chocula and Franken Berry recipes were reformulated to remove this pigment.

Boo Berry, the first blueberry-flavored cereal, was released in December 1972 (released nationally in February 1973), and Frute Brute in 1974. Frute Brute was discontinued by 1982 and replaced in 1988 by Fruity Yummy Mummy, which was discontinued in 1992. During this period, Frute Brute made conspicuous appearances in two films by Quentin Tarantino, Pulp Fiction and Reservoir Dogs, as a visual easter egg.

In 2005, Count Chocula was shown in MasterCard's "Icons" commercial during Super Bowl XXXIX, where many famous advertising mascots are seen having dinner together.
In 2006 or 2009, the Monster Cereals started being released seasonally only, no longer being released year-round.
In 2010, Betty Crocker released Franken Berry and Boo Berry Fruit Roll-Ups. General Mills released Count Chocula cereal bars.

Since 2010, Franken Berry, Boo Berry, and Count Chocula cereals have been manufactured and sold only for a few months during the autumn/Halloween season in September and October. As of late 2010, information such as nutrition data and historical facts can still be found on the official General Mills website at all times of the year.

In 2012, the Monster Cereals were on the verge of extinction, but in August 2013, General Mills released all five monster cereals for purchase during the Halloween season. Both Fruit Brute, which was being released for the first time in 31 years, and Fruity Yummy Mummy, which was being released for the first time in 21 years, received updated packaging like the other cereals, and the Fruit Brute variant was renamed Frute Brute. Additionally, it was revealed on I-Mockery that special retro edition boxes of all five cereals with their original packaging art would be sold exclusively at Target stores. Unfortunately, Frute Brute and Fruity Yummy Mummy only stayed on store shelves for only one Halloween season, and then got discontinued again.

In 2014, General Mills enlisted the help of DC Comics to create new designs for the cereals in time for that Halloween. The designs, revealed on August 6, consisted of a Boo Berry design by Jim Lee, a Count Chocula design by Terry Dodson and a Franken Berry design by Dave Johnson.

In 2021, it was announced that the company would celebrate the 50th anniversary of the introduction of the Monster Cereals by releasing an amalgamated cereal entitled Monster Mash.

In August 2022, due to the success of the 50th anniversary celebration, Frute Brute returned, and the covers of all four cereals that year featured artwork by KAWS inspired by the vintage designs.

Prizes 
Until the early 1980s, the monster cereals were also known for their wide variety of both in-pack and mail-away cereal premiums.  Many items, such as posters, stickers, paint sets, speedster cars, parachutes, and even vinyl advertising figures, were produced. In 1979, three flexi-discs were made available via cereal boxes: "The Monsters Go Disco", "Count Chocula Goes To Hollywood" and "Monster Adventures In Outer Space".

See also
 List of breakfast cereal advertising characters
 List of breakfast cereals

References

External links

(Archived from the original on April 15, 2012)
 
 
 

General Mills cereals
Halloween food
Products introduced in 1971
Gothic fiction